Jacques Brel's career spanned over three decades and encompassed a number of singles, EPs, 10" albums and 12" LPs. His songs were often repackaged and resold under different covers and titles, which makes compiling a complete collection of Brel's recordings a difficult task. This discography brings together Brel's original studio albums, live albums, singles and EPs, as well as notable compilations and live albums.

To date, Brel's albums are reported to sell over 200,000 copies per year.

Studio albums

Although Brel's discography has been released in many permutations and under different titles, the below discography lists the album titles according to their original cover art with notable alternative titles presented in brackets.

With Philips Records

With Barclay Records

Compilation albums
The majority of these notable compilations contain songs released previously on Brel's 10" albums. These include compilations which are often repackaged as original albums in compilations such as Boîte à Bonbons and Suivre L'Etoile. Brel's 12" LPs before 1967's Jacques Brel 67 are all compilations.

Live albums

Singles

These singles are 45rpm unless otherwise indicated.

With Philips Records

With Barclay Records

References

Discographies of Belgian artists